Sichuan Yema Automobile Co., Ltd. is a Chinese automobile manufacturer which has built buses and automobiles under the Yema brand since 2002. The company was founded in the 1980s. In January 2019, Yema Auto was acquired by Levdeo, a Chinese low-speed electric vehicle company that produces Neighborhood Electric Vehicles.

Development
Yema Auto has three manufacturing bases located separately in Chengdu and Mianyang: the Chengdu HQ, Chengdu New Energy Branch and Mianyang Branch. The Chengdu HQ includes Chengdu Passenger Vehicle Co. and Chengdu Bus Co., where coaches, commuter buses, city buses, passenger vehicles (SUVs and MPVs) and new energy vehicles are made. 

The Mianyang Branch is located in Mianyang Hi-tech Industrial Development Zone, covering an area of around 1.3 million square meters, with total investment of over 3 billion RMB. It has established a first-rate-equipped manufacturing base with four complete vehicle-production processes of multi-vehicle & full automation production lines for both traditional and new energy vehicles in the year of 2014.

As of January 2019, Levdeo acquired Yema Auto and revealed plans to strategically reorganized it, launching electric vehicles built on existing Yemo gasoline vehicle platforms under the newly launched Letin brand.
 
The Yema Brand products cover passenger vehicles, buses and new energy vehicles (electric passenger vehicles, and electric buses), including over 40 models.

Models

Non production

 SQJ6480 Estate (prototype only)
 SQJ6485 Estate SUV (prototype only)

Van
 SQJ6450/6450N (Austin Maestro van)

MPV
 Spica (MPV, shaped like the Toyota Alphard)

CUV

 SQJ6451/F99 (Subaru Forester lookalike)
 F10 (Subaru Forester lookalike with an Audi-style grille)
 F12 (Subaru Forester lookalike with a Kia-style front end)
 F16 (Subaru Forester lookalike with a slightly different Kia-style front end)
 T60 (博骏) (Since 2018)
 T70 (Compact CUV, with 1.5T, 1.8L and 1.8T of displacement)
 T80 (Mid-size CUV)

New Energy Vehicle (NEV)
 EC70 (Electric CUV based on the T70)
 EC60 (Electric compact CUV based on the T60)
 EC30 (Electric MPV based on the Spica)

References

External links
 Official Global Site (defunct)

Bus manufacturers of China
Electric vehicle manufacturers of China
Companies based in Chengdu
Chinese brands
Car manufacturers of China
Chinese companies established in 1994
Vehicle manufacturing companies established in 1994